Maksim Olegovich Rybalko (born 1 September 1981) is a former Russian professional football player.

Club career
He played in the Russian Football National League for FC Irtysh Omsk in 2010.

References

External links
 

1981 births
Living people
Russian footballers
Association football defenders
FC Irtysh Omsk players